Selva María is a Venezuelan telenovela produced by RCTV in 1987 based on the telenovela Mariana de la noche by Cuban writer Delia Fiallo. This remake was adapted by Gustavo Michelena.

Mariela Alcalá and Franklin Virgüez starred as the protagonists accompanied by Guillermo Ferrán and Hilda Abrahamz as the antagonists.

Plot
Selva María is the daughter of a mining entrepreneur Fernando Altamirano. As a child, she left town to study in a convent run by nuns in Caracas. During her years of study she never had contact with her father but with her paternal aunt Adelaida who came to visit her often. Once she finishes her studies, Selva María happily returns to her home, but she is unaware that Fernando is not her real father and is an evil man who does everything in his power so that no man approaches her.

However, Selva María meets Rodrigo, a handsome journalist who falls in love with her despite Fernando's opposition. Their relationship will also be opposed by Carla, Fernado's sister who dresses like a man and is cruel to the miners. She will join forces with her brother to separate Selva María and Rodrigo.

Cast
Mariela Alcalá as Selva María Altamirano
Franklin Virgüez as Rodrigo Reyes-Navas / Cheo Reyna
Tomás Henríquez as Cuaima
Hilda Abrahamz as Carla Altamirano
América Barrios as Mirita
Dalila Colombo as Evelyn
Guillermo Ferrán as Fernando Altamirano
Roberto Moll as Dr. Andrés Ávila
Sebastián Falco as Killer
Ignacio Navarro as Klauss
Carlos Villamizar as Joaquín Mijares
Dilia Waikarán as Gioconda
Arístides Aguiar as Ing. Germán Figueroa
Abby Raymond as Magui Altamirano
Helianta Cruz as Adelaida Altamirano

References

External links

Opening credits

1987 telenovelas
RCTV telenovelas
Venezuelan telenovelas
1987 Venezuelan television series debuts
1988 Venezuelan television series endings
Spanish-language telenovelas
Television shows set in Venezuela